Assault & Battery is the second studio album by Australian hard rock band Rose Tattoo, released in September 1981 and peaked at number 27 on the Kent Music Report.

Track listing
 "Out of This Place" (Anderson, Cocks)
 "All the Lessons" (Anderson, Cocks)
 "Let It Go" (Anderson, Cocks)
 "Assault & Battery" (Anderson, Cocks)
 "Magnum Maid" (Anderson, Wells)
 "Rock 'n' Roll Is King" (Anderson, Cocks)
 "Manzil Madness" (Anderson, Wells)
 "Chinese Dunkirk" (Anderson, Leach, Cocks, Royall, Wells)
 "Sidewalk Sally" (Anderson, Cocks)
 "Suicide City" (Anderson, Cocks)

Charts

Personnel
 Angry Anderson – lead vocals
 Peter Wells – slide guitar & vocals
 Mick Cocks – lead & rhythm guitar
 Geordie Leach – bass
 Dallas "Digger" Royall – drums
 Engineer: Colin Freeman
 Mixdown Engineer: Sam Horsburgh

References

External links

 

1981 albums